Rangeliosis is a disease of dogs and other species, caused by the hemoprotozoan parasite Rangelia vitalii.

Clinical presentation

Clinically affected dogs present with splenomegaly, icterus, anemia and thrombocytopenia.

Many dogs may succumb to infection without veterinary intervention.

Treatment

Treatment is usually effective with antiprotozoal drugs.

References

Dog diseases